The 1987-88 Cleveland Cavaliers season was the 18th season of NBA basketball in Cleveland, Ohio. The Cavaliers acquired Larry Nance from the Phoenix Suns in exchange for top draft pick Kevin Johnson in a midseason trade, and finished 4th in the Central Division with a 42–40 record. Second-year star Brad Daugherty was selected for the 1988 NBA All-Star Game. Second-year guard Ron Harper played just 57 games due to injury. In the first round of the playoffs, the Cavaliers lost in five games to the Chicago Bulls.

Key Dates:

Draft picks

 2nd round pick (#29) traded to Portland in Linton Townes deal. Used to draft Lester Fonville.

*2nd round pick acquired from Milwaukee in Paul Thompson deal.

**5th round pick acquired from Indiana in Ron Anderson deal.

Roster

Regular season

Season standings

Notes
 z, y – division champions
 x – clinched playoff spot

Record vs. opponents

Game log

Regular season

|- align="center" bgcolor="#ffcccc"
| 5
| November 14, 19877:30 PM EST
| Detroit
| L 113–128
|
|
|
| Richfield Coliseum10,157
| 1–4

|- align="center" bgcolor="#ccffcc"
| 14
| December 5, 19877:30 PM EST
| L.A. Lakers
| W 97–95
|
|
|
| Richfield Coliseum20,015
| 6–8
|- align="center" bgcolor="#ffcccc"
| 18
| December 13, 198710:30 PM EST
| @ L.A. Lakers
| L 89–90
|
|
|
| The Forum17,505
| 7–11
|- align="center" bgcolor="#ccffcc"
| 19
| December 15, 19877:30 PM EST
| Dallas
| W 106–93
|
|
|
| Richfield Coliseum6,852
| 8–11

|- align="center" bgcolor="#ffcccc"
| 35
| January 15, 19887:30 PM EST
| @ Detroit
| L 93–97
|
|
|
| Pontiac Silverdome19,622
| 17–18

|- align="center" bgcolor="#ccffcc"
| 43
| February 1, 19887:30 PM EST
| Detroit
| W 94–83
|
|
|
| Richfield Coliseum10,636
| 22–21
|- align="center" bgcolor="#ffcccc"
| 54
| February 24, 19888:30 PM EST
| @ Dallas
| L 89–93
|
|
|
| Reunion Arena17,007
| 28–26

|- align="center" bgcolor="#ffcccc"
| 62
| March 12, 19887:30 PM EST
| @ Detroit
| L 100–104
|
|
|
| Pontiac Silverdome33,854
| 30–32
|- align="center" bgcolor="#ffcccc"
| 65
| March 17, 19887:30 PM EST
| Detroit
| L 99–102
|
|
|
| Richfield Coliseum13,261
| 30–35

|- align="center" bgcolor="#ffcccc"
| 78
| April 13, 19887:30 PM EST
| @ Detroit
| L 98–115
|
|
|
| Pontiac Silverdome18,808
| 38–40

Playoffs

|- align="center" bgcolor="#ffcccc"
| 1
| April 28
| @ Chicago
| L 93–104
| Craig Ehlo (21)
| Larry Nance (8)
| Mark Price (12)
| Chicago Stadium18,676
| 0–1
|- align="center" bgcolor="#ffcccc"
| 2
| May 1
| @ Chicago
| L 101–106
| Larry Nance (27)
| Brad Daugherty (13)
| Larry Nance (8)
| Chicago Stadium18,645
| 0–2
|- align="center" bgcolor="#ccffcc"
| 3
| May 3
| Chicago
| W 110–102
| Mark Price (31)
| Brad Daugherty (10)
| Mark Price (6)
| Richfield Coliseum20,068
| 1–2
|- align="center" bgcolor="#ccffcc"
| 4
| May 5
| Chicago
| W 97–91
| Ron Harper (30)
| Brad Daugherty (9)
| Mark Price (7)
| Richfield Coliseum20,026
| 2–2
|- align="center" bgcolor="#ffcccc"
| 5
| May 8
| @ Chicago
| L 101–107
| Mark Price (25)
| Brad Daugherty (10)
| Mark Price (7)
| Chicago Stadium18,008
| 2–3

Player stats

Regular season

Playoffs

Player Statistics Citation:

Awards and records

Awards

Records

Milestones

All-Star

Transactions

Trades

Free Agents

Development League

References

 Cleveland Cavaliers on Database Basketball
 Cleveland Cavaliers on Basketball Reference

Cleveland Cavaliers seasons
Cleveland
Cleveland